Nuni may refer to:

People
 Geula Nuni (1942–2014), Israeli actress and singer
 Nuni Omot (born 1994), South Sudanese basketball player
 Siddhartha Nuni (fl. 2012–2022), Indian film director
 Zintkala Nuni (1890–1920), Lakota Sioux woman

Other
 Nuni language
 Ain Nuni, a village in Iraq

See also
 Nuna people, of Burkina Faso, speakers of the Nuni language
 Nuny, Poland